Hang The DJ is a 1998 music documentary film debut by identical twin brothers Marco and Mauro La Villa. The idea for this documentary came to them in 1992 while they were working at their uncle's pizza store on St-Laurent Boulevard in Montreal to help pay tuition for a degree in Film Studies at Concordia University. The brothers originally had no interest in DJs or documentaries but became interested in the scene after working late nights and meeting the regular neighborhood club crowd. Mauro has said, "we heard a lot about the gossip and conflicts of the DJ world", which gave the brothers the idea to make a documentary by following disc jockeys around the world to get a sense of what being a DJ really was. Featuring Roger Sanchez, Junior Vasquez, DJ Qbert and A-Trak, the film presents the cult of DJs in the era that catapulted them into superstars from the underground. The documentary contains a mix of DJ sets from around the globe counterbalanced with commentary from fans and interviews with the DJs.

The film's name comes from the lyrics of the 1986 song "Panic" by The Smiths, which Mauro described as "the anthem of our high school years".

Production
The film was shot over a period of two years throughout 1996 and 1997. The shooting locations encompassed many cultural hubs from around the world, including Amsterdam, Cannes, Essen, Liverpool, London, Las Vegas, Los Angeles, Madrid, Miami, Montreal, New York City, Nottingham, Paris, San Francisco, Tokyo, and Washington, D.C.

Release

Locations 
Hang the DJ premiered at the 1998 Toronto International Film Festival in September 1998 and also screened at the International Documentary Film Festival Amsterdam, the Stockholm International Film Festival, the Melbourne International Film Festival and the New Zealand International Film Festival previous to its theatrical release. The film was later released in a select 13 Canadian cities and lasted four weeks in Cineplex Odeon theaters through the month of January in 2001; continuing to run in select second-run cinemas until March.

Merchandise 
To promote the film the La Villa brothers partnered with an array of different companies releasing an arrange of products, including posters, postcards, an Austrian-based energy drink with Power Horse and a clothing collaboration with Tommy Hilfiger.

Soundtrack

Critical reception 
Hang the DJ opened to relatively positive reviews from fans. Many critics found the movie to not have a central theme and felt that the documentary tried to cover too much information without having any real outcome. Wesley Morris wrote for the San Francisco Chronicle stating that "the film doesn't present a particularly persuasive case for any of its turntablist subjects".

Accolades

See also 
Hang the DJ (Black Mirror)

External links

Notes

Documentary films about electronic music and musicians
Canadian documentary films
1998 films
1990s English-language films
1990s Canadian films